William Maher (born 1979) is an Irish retired hurler, and current manager and coach. Maher is a former manager of the Tipperary under-21 hurling team from November 2015 until July 2017.

Born in Ballingarry, County Tipperary, Maher first played competitive hurling whilst at school in St. Kieran's College. He arrived on the inter-county scene at the age of seventeen when he first linked up with the Tipperary minor team, before later lining out with the under-21 side. He played a number of games at senior level during the National Hurling League, until an eye injury ended his career in 2002.

At club level Maher played with Ballingarry.

In retirement from playing Maher became involved in team management and coaching. He began his coaching career with club side Ballingarry before later serving as a selector with the Dublin minor team in 2008. Maher was a selector with the victorious Tipperary under-21 team in 2010 before later guiding the Tipperary minor team to All-Ireland success in 2012. In October 2013 he became part of Derek McGrath's management team to the Waterford senior hurlers.

In November 2015, Maher was named as the new manager of the Tipperary Under-21 hurling team.

Maher stepped down as Under-21 manager in July 2017 due to work commitments.

Honours

Player

Waterford Institute of Technology
Fitzgibbon Cup (2) 1999 2000

Tipperary
National Hurling League (1): 1999 (sub)
All-Ireland Minor Hurling Championship (1): 1996 (c)
Munster Minor Hurling Championship (2): 1996 (c), 1997

Manager/Coach 

Tipperary
All-Ireland Under-21 Hurling Championship (1): 2010
Munster Under-21 Hurling Championship (1): 2010
All-Ireland Minor Hurling Championship (1): 2012
Munster Minor Hurling Championship (1): 2012

References

1979 births
Living people
Ballingarry hurlers
Tipperary inter-county hurlers
Hurling managers
Hurling selectors